The first USS Oahu (PR-6), a Yangtze River gunboat, was laid down by Kiangnan Dock and Engineering Works, Shanghai, China, 18 December 1926; launched as PG–46 on 26 November 1927; sponsored by Mrs. Bryson Bruce, wife of Comdr. Bruce; and commissioned 22 October 1928, Lt. Comdr. A. C. Thomas in command.

Service history
She then operated all along the Yangtze from the river's mouth to Chungking and in the tributaries in protection of American lives and property into the 1930s. In the course of her service with the Yangtze Patrol Force, the gunboat convoyed American and foreign merchantmen up and down the river, supplied armed guards to U.S. and British river craft, landed bluejackets at treaty ports threatened by unrest and evacuated foreign nationals in times of danger.

Beginning in 1934, Oahu took up duty as station ship at various Yangtze ports supplying the increasing river traffic with naval armed guard detachments on a regular basis. Serving station ship duty at Ichang, Chungking, Hankow, Wuhu, and Nanking into 1937, the gunboat made intermittent patrols down the length of the river on convoy duty and then following the Japanese invasion of China in July, served as escort for merchantmen and protected American neutrality in the conflict.

As the Japanese campaign in China grew, the gunboat operated only on the lower river as far as Wuhu and Hankow, in addition serving as station ship and radio relay vessel for American officials at the temporary U.S. embassy at Nanking. Whenever the warship attempted to cruise the river on regular patrol, she was convoyed by Japanese minesweepers that kept watch on her movements while protecting her from attacks by their planes. Oahu remained as station ship at ports below Hankow, returning to the latter city to refit and give liberty to her crew until late in November 1941 and then, under orders of Commander, Asiatic Fleet departed Shanghai for the Philippines as signs of approaching war with Japan became clearer.

Following a long and difficult voyage across the South China Sea, the gunboat, never designed for open sea operations, arrived at Manila Bay in the week before the attack on Pearl Harbor. When war began, the warship operated in and around Manila Bay and Cavite Navy Yard on inshore patrol and in support of U.S.-Filipino forces on Bataan until after the fall of that peninsula 8 April 1942, and then continued to operate about the island fortress of Corregidor until sunk by enemy gunfire on 5 May. She was struck from the Navy List three days later.

Oahu, one of the last "old China hands", never actually voyaged to the U.S. She received one battle star for World War II service.
She is sunk at the "tadpole's tail end" at Corregidor (in 20 feet of water). The only thing showing is the ship's railing. Everything else is buried in the very small coral gravel. She may have sunk and washed up in the bay at the end of the island, and slowly settled down into the sand and gravel and still lies there.

Awards
Yangtze Service Medal
China Service Medal
American Defense Service Medal with "FLEET" clasp
Asiatic-Pacific Campaign Medal with one battle star
World War II Victory Medal
Philippine Presidential Unit Citation
Philippine Defense Medal with star

References

External links
NavSource Online: River Gunboat Photo Archive: USS Oahu

Oahu (PR-6)
Ships built in China
1927 ships
Maritime incidents in May 1942
World War II shipwrecks in the Pacific Ocean
Riverine warfare